Dayia may refer to:
 Dayia (plant), a genus of flowering plants in the family Polemoniaceae
 Dayia (brachiopod), a fossil genus of brachiopods in the family Dayiidae